is a Japanese former football player.

Club career statistics
Updated to 23 February 2017.

References

External links

1991 births
Living people
Hannan University alumni
Association football people from Hokkaido
Japanese footballers
J2 League players
J3 League players
Hokkaido Consadole Sapporo players
SC Sagamihara players
Iwate Grulla Morioka players
Association football forwards